Goodbye Mr. Black is a 2016 South Korean television series based on the manhwa of the same title, created with The Count of Monte Cristo motif, written by  and published in 1983. It aired on MBC on Wednesdays and Thursdays at 21:55 (KST) from March 16, 2016, to May 19, 2016, for 20 episodes.

Plot
Cha Ji-won is a Navy SEAL demolitions officer, but he is betrayed by his best friend, then denounced as a traitor. Ji-won is sent to another country, but escapes and returns with a new identity, along with a "fake" wife, to take revenge.

Cast

Main characters
Lee Jin-wook as Cha Ji-won / Black
Lee Hee-seong as child Cha Ji-won
Moon Chae-won as Kim Swan / Khaya / Baek Eun-young
Lee Chae-yoon as child Kim Swan (Baek Eun-young)
Kim Kang-woo as Min Seon-jae
Jeong Jae-hyuk as child Min Seon-jae
Song Jae-rim as Seo Woo-jin
Yoo In-young as Yoon Ma-ri

Supporting characters

People around Cha Ji-won
Lee Won-jong as Go Sung-min
Im Se-mi as Cha Ji-soo
Kwon Ji-min as child Cha Ji-soo
Ha Yeon-joo as Mei
 as Ahn Gye-dong

People around Kim Swan
Kim Tae-woo as Kim Ji-ryoon
Jung Hye-sun as Jeong Hyun-sook

People around Min Seon-jae
 as Baek Eun-do (Jo Seong-bae)
Choi Jung-woo as Seo Jin-tak
Lee Dae-yeon as Min Yong-jae
 as director Nam Seong-woo
 as general manager Park Beom-sik (Baek Eun-do's secretary)

Extended cast
Gil Hae-yeon as Hong In-ja
Wi Ha-joon as Ha-joon
Lee Jae-woo as Jae-woo
 as Se-yang

 as general manager Choi

 as inspector Kim Seong-min 

 as Park Seok-min
 as killer

Cameo appearances
Jung Dong-hwan as Cha Jae-wan
Lee Jae-yong as Yoon Jae-min

Daniel Joey Albright as Top Investor Fred in episode 8

Ratings
In the table below, the blue numbers represent the lowest ratings and the red numbers represent the highest ratings.

Original soundtrack

References

External links

Goodbye Mr. Black at Daum 

MBC TV television dramas
2016 South Korean television series debuts
Korean-language television shows
2016 South Korean television series endings
South Korean thriller television series
Television series by Victory Contents